French Navy modernization is pursued on the basis of successive Projet de loi de programmation militaire ("Military programme law projects - LPM). These defence modernization plans are formulated on a rolling basis pursuant to strategic, political and budgetary factors and pressures. The latest LPM covers the period 2024 to 2030 and is organized around four strategic priorities: strengthening deterrence, preparation for high intensity operations, protecting interests in all French territories and key domains and strengthening international partnerships.

Current program modernizations are anchored in the commitment to replace the aircraft carrier Charles de Gaulle with a new nuclear-powered aircraft carrier as well as in the commitment to maintain an ongoing force of at least 15 large frigate/destroyer sized ships (i.e. the "first rank" surface combatants).

Modernization also encompasses other core and supporting capabilities including: the ballistic-missile submarines of the national nuclear deterrent, the nuclear-powered attack submarine fleet, the patrol vessel force, mine warfare units, major support ships as well as French naval aviation and other naval weapon, sensor and reconnaissance systems.

As of 2023, principal modernization projects include:

Core Surface and Sub-Surface Capabilities

 1 new nuclear-powered aircraft carrier (PANG) - Vessel to enter service in about 2038. In October 2018, the French Ministry of Defence launched an 18-month study for €40 million for the future replacement of the Charles de Gaulle beyond 2030. In December 2020, President Macron announced that construction would begin in around 2025 with sea trials to start in about 2036. The carrier is planned to have a displacement of around 75,000 tons and to carry about 32 next-generation fighters, two to three E-2D Advanced Hawkeyes and a yet-to-be-determined number of unmanned carrier air vehicles.
 4 SNLE 3G Ballistic-missile nuclear-powered submarines (SSBN) - Studies were initiated in 2017 on the construction of a new class of SSBNs to renew the national nuclear deterrent in the 2030s. Current plans envisage the start of construction to begin in 2023 with the first new SSBN to enter service in about 2035. Deliveries of the three follow-on boats are expected to occur thereafter at five year intervals.
 6 nuclear attack submarines of the Barracuda-class - the contract for the first three of these submarines was signed in 2006. The construction of the first boat in the class also began in 2006 and she was commissioned in 2020. The additional boats in the class will enter service through the 2020s, with the sixth submarine planned for service entry in 2030.
 5 FTI/FDI (Frégate de Défense et d'Intervention) mid-size frigates from 2024  - Construction work on modules for the lead ship of the FDI class, Admiral Ronarc'h, began in October 2019. She was formally laid down on 17 December 2021 and launched in November 2022. The FDI program follows on the construction of 8 FREMM multipurpose frigates for the navy, the first of which was delivered in 2012 and the last in 2022. In 2015 the order of FREMM-class units was limited to 8 ships and it was decided to proceed with the purchase of the five FTI/FDI mid-size frigates instead. 
 Modernization of 3  general purpose frigates (La Fayette, Courbet and Aconit) - three ships of this existing class are being fitted with a hull-mounted sonar as well as incorporating other improvements. The first vessel, Courbet, began her conversion refit in October 2020. She returned to sea in June 2021. La Fayette began her upgrade in October 2021 and in November 2022 was declared fully operational with her new systems. Aconit began her conversion refit in February 2023.

Sovereignty Protection Vessels

 6 POM-type (Patrouilleur Outre-mer) patrol vessels - these vessels are being delivered between 2023 and 2025 to protect the exclusive economic zone of French overseas territories in the Indian Ocean and the Pacific. Two ships each are to be based in New Caledonia, Tahiti and Réunion respectively. The vessels were ordered in December 2019 and began construction in October 2020. In May 2021, it was reported that the delivery of the first of these vessels would be delayed, from an originally planned in-service date of 2022, until 2023. The lead ship of the class, Auguste Benebig, was launched at the Socarenam shipyard in Saint Malo on October 15, 2021 and began sea trials in July 2022. It is planned that the lead vessel of the class will be based with French naval forces in New Caledonia from 2023.
 7 Patrouilleurs Hauturiers (PH) - this class is planned to replace the navy's A-69 D'Estienne d'Orves-class avisos/offshore patrol vessels based in both the Atlantic and Mediterranean, and the PSP Flamant-class coast guard vessels based in Cherbourg. Initial concepts envisaged 10 ocean-going patrol vessels of about 2,000-tons with initial delivery planned for 2025. However, for cost reasons the concept has been scaled back to only 7 ships of somewhat more limited capability, equipped with the Thales and Nexter 40mm RAPIDFire gun, but with delivery now envisaged as starting in 2026.
 The joint-European Patrol Corvette program - currently under consideration by several European states including France. For the French Navy it is envisaged that the vessel may replace the Navy's six Floréal-class surveillance frigates starting in about 2030.

Mine Warfare Vessels

 Système de lutte anti-mines futur (SLAM-F) - Various systems have been ordered to replace current French Navy mine warfare vessels (Éridan-class minehunters, sonar towing vessels, EOD diver vessels). Originally it was anticipated that delivery of the various systems would be completed by 2029. However, in 2021 it was indicated that some of the larger systems would be delayed likely into the next Loi de Programmation Militaire period (2026-2032 LPM) due to impacts arising from the Covid-19 pandemic. When delivered, the system will consist of: 8x Unmanned systems (with four to be delivered by 2024); 6x motherships (“bâtiments de guerre des mines”); 5x EOD divers support vessels (“bâtiments base plongeurs démineurs nouvelle generation”); and, 1x Mine Warfare Data Operating System (SEDGM). Initial operating capability for the unmanned systems is envisaged from late 2023 starting with shore-based elements. The first unmanned Mine Warfare Prototype of the system was delivered in November 2021. At Euronaval 2022 a partnership was signed between the Belgian, Dutch and French navies to enhance cooperation between them. As a result the French Navy will order six variant ships based on the City-class, via the SLAM-F program in 2023.

Support Ships

 4 ships of the Jacques Chevallier-class - these vessels are derivatives of Italy's Vulcano-class logistic support ship and will be delivered to the French Navy between 2023 to 2029. They will replace the current  support ships and will be able to carry fuel, arms and ammunition, spare parts and food. They will possess workshops to perform repairs and carry and support helicopters for maritime operations. The French vessels will be larger than their Italian counterparts with a greater requirement to carry aviation fuel. The vessels will be known as the Jacques Chevallier-class in French service. The lead ship of the class, Jacques Chevallier, began construction in May 2020. She was launched in April 2022, began sea trials in December and was delivered in March 2023. The second ship of the class (Jacques Stosskopf) began construction in February 2022.

Landing Craft

 14 EDA-S Amphibious Standard Landing Craft (Engins de Débarquement Amphibie – Standards) - the craft have been ordered to replace CTM landing craft carried on the Mistral-class helicopter assault ships and to restore a light amphibious transport capability to French naval forces protecting certain of its overseas territories (Mayotte, New Caledonia, Martinique and French Guiana) and for operations around Djibouti. The vessels have a payload capacity of 65 to 80 tonnes and a maximum speed of 11 knots (at full load). The first two EDA-S vessels (Arbalète and Arquebuse) were delivered to the navy in November 2021 and entered service in July 2022. The next four in the program are intended for the naval base at Toulon and are to start delivery in mid-2023. Deliveries will continue up to 2025.

Naval Aviation and Weapon System Modernization

 18 ATL2 Maritime Patrol Aircraft are being upgraded to the “Standard 6” upgrade incorporating a new radar, new acoustic subsystem and other improvements. Eighteen aircraft are being upgraded starting in 2020 in order to remain operationally relevant up to 2035. Three of the enhanced aircraft were delivered by mid-2020 and the system was declared to have reached initial operating capability in December 2020. Full operating capability was achieved in 2021 when the fifth of the upgraded aircraft was delivered.  A sixth upgraded aircraft was delivered in December 2021, a seventh in April 2022 and the eighth and ninth were received in July. Upgrades of the remaining aircraft in the fleet are to continue until 2024. In November 2022, the upgraded aircraft was said to have reached the milestone of being able to preform the entire spectrum of missions assigned to it. 
 49 H160M helicopters are to be supplied to the Navy starting in 2029; six commercial H160s for search and rescue started delivery in May 2022 Pending the delivery of the H160M, the French Navy has leased twelve Dauphin N3 helicopters as part of an interim helicopter fleet which will serve through the 2020s.
 3 E-2D advanced Hawkeye carrier-capable early warning aircraft will be introduced starting in 2030 to replace the E-2C variant of the aircraft
 7 (with an eventual projected total of 12) Albatros Maritime Surveillance and Intervention Aircraft (AVSIMAR) will be procured starting in 2025
 Upgraded variants of the Exocet surface-to-surface missile are being delivered, principally the Block 3c variant of the missile starting in December 2022
 Aster and Sylver Vertical Launching Systems for anti-missile/anti-air defence are being procured
 SCALP EG land-attack cruise missiles are being deployed in  surface (the ASW/land-attack variant of the Aquitaine-class frigate), sub-surface (the Barracuda-class submarine) and aviation (Rafale M carrier-based aircraft) platforms.

Notes

Decision on future French aircraft carrier - December 2020 - https://news.yahoo.com/frances-next-generation-aircraft-carrier-164947235.html

References
 

French Navy
Military planning